Darkspace usually refers to the intergalactic void that exists between celestial galaxies.

It may refer to:
DarkSpace, a computer game
Darkspace, a Swiss ambient black metal band
"Darkspace", a song by Morten Harket from Letter from Egypt
"Darkspace", a short story by Robert F. Young
Dark Space, a 2013 film
Dark Space, a role-playing game supplement for Space Master by Monte Cook, published by Iron Crown Enterprises